Kulayan Natin is the debut studio album by Filipino indie folk band Munimuni. It was released on July 26, 2019 by Marilag Records and Productions.

Background
Two years after releasing their debut EP, Munimuni finally released their debut album.

Its title comes from the last song of the album, "Kulayan Natin".

Singles
The first single of the album, "Tahanan" was released in March 2018. The song is about someone assuring a person experiencing difficulties that he will stay no matter what life brings. Owen Castro, the writer of the song, shared in an interview, "That’s nice, because that’s the goal of the song, to release all your tears. So if there are tears still left inside, you should let it out. Crying on that first line is okay because it means the tears will soon run out."

The second single of the album, "Oras" was released in August 2018.

The third single of the album, "Kalachuchi" was released in December 2018. The inspiration behind the song was during his days at the University of the Philippines Diliman, de Ocampo was walking with a “special person” inside the university premises sometime in May years ago, talking about the latter's problem, when that person saw kalachuchi flowers blossoming inside the university grounds.

Track listing

Personnel

Munimuni
 Adj Jiao – lead vocals ("Simula", "Bakunawa", "Oras", "Kulayan Natin"), guitar, backing vocals
 TJ de Ocampo – guitar, lead vocals ("Bahay na Puti", "Solomon", "Bawat Piyesa", "Kalachuchi", "Banaag"), backing vocals
 John Owen Castro – flute, backing vocals, lead vocals ("Tahanan", "Pagsibol")
 Jolo Ferrer – bass
 Josh Tumaliuan – drums

Additional personnel
Clara Benin – co-lead vocals ("Solomon")
Martin Honasan – creative director
Arvin Ventura – sound engineer, mixing, mastering
Luke Sigua – assistant sound engineer

References

2019 debut albums